The Albanian Basketball First Division is the men's second tier basketball league in Albania. It is the lower division of the Albanian Basketball League which is organised by the Albanian Basketball Association.

Champions

See also
 Albanian Basketball League
 Albanian Basketball Cup
 Albanian Basketball Supercup

References

First Division
2
Albania
1946 establishments in Albania
Sports leagues established in 1946